Eldina Ahmić (born 21 August 1994) is a Bosnian-Herzegovinian football player. She plays as a midfielder for Swedish club IF Brommapojkarna.

External links 
 
 
 
 

1994 births
Living people
Footballers from Stockholm
Women's association football midfielders
Bosnia and Herzegovina women's footballers
Bosnia and Herzegovina women's international footballers
AIK Fotboll (women) players
IF Brommapojkarna (women) players
Damallsvenskan players
Bosnia and Herzegovina expatriate women's footballers
Expatriate women's footballers in Sweden
Elitettan players